Dunyazad is a large crater on Saturn's moon Enceladus first discovered by the Voyager 2 spacecraft. It is named after Dunyazad, the sister of Scheherazade in The Book of One Thousand and One Nights.

It is the southernmost crater of a prominent crater triplet on Enceladus' anti-Saturnian hemisphere (there is no evidence that the impacts are related or were formed from break-up of a single body, like Shoemaker-Levy 9). The craters to its north are Shahrazad, and Al-Haddar. Voyager 2 discovery images of this crater revealed an up-domed floor at Dunyazad, suggesting that the crater had been modified by viscous relaxation. Higher resolution views of Dunyazad taken by the Cassini Spacecraft during a close flyby on March 9, 2005 reveal not only an up-domed floor, but numerous tectonic fractures as well, particularly within the dome and northeastern crater rim.

References

Impact craters on Enceladus